The 1970 Volta a Catalunya was the 50th edition of the Volta a Catalunya cycle race and was held from 10 September to 18 September 1970. The race started in Manresa and finished in Barcelona. It was won by Franco Bitossi.

General classification

References

1970
Volta
1970 in Spanish road cycling
September 1970 sports events in Europe